Hands On Science Outreach, Inc. was a national nonprofit organization registered in Maryland, United States, that conducted informal science education programs from 1984 to 2007. Their first program was entitled "Hands On Science Outreach".

References

Non-profit organizations based in Maryland
Organizations established in 1984